Malaki Iupeli (23 November 1965 - 1996) is a former Samoan rugby union player. He played as a flanker.

Career
At club level, Iupeli played for Marist St. Joseph for his entire career.
His first international match was on May 28, 1988 against Tonga at Apia. Although not being included in the 1991 Rugby World Cup roster, he was part of the 1995 Rugby World Cup roster, playing only the match against England, in Durban. He played 16 matches for Samoa.

Death
In 1995, Iupeli was diagnosed with HIV, and later his wife Peati Iupeli and his eldest young son became infected with the virus. A year later, both Malaki and his eldest son died.
Peati, being HIV-positive, was fired from the bank where she had previously worked. After the death of her husband, she became a well-known AIDS activist, raising single-handedly the second child from Malaki, a son named Natal. She lived to be 60 years old and died on 28 May 2015.

References

External links
 Malaki Iupeli International Statistics

1965 births
1996 deaths
AIDS-related deaths in Samoa
Sportspeople from Apia
Samoan rugby union players
Rugby union flankers
Samoa international rugby union players